René Frégni (born 1947) is a French novelist.

Early life
Frégni was born in 1947 in Marseille.

Career
Frégni owned a restaurant on the main square of Manosque, which he sold after his business associate was arrested for money laundering. He wrote about the experience in his 2004 novel entitled Lettre à mes tueurs.

Frégni is the author of 15 novels. He won the Prix Eugène-Dabit du roman populiste for Les chemins noirs in 1989. He also won the Prix Mottart from the Académie française for Tendresse des loups in 1990. He also the Prix Paul-Léautaud for Elle danse dans le noir in 1998, the Prix Antigone for On ne s'endort jamais seul in 2001, the Prix Monte-Cristo for Tu tomberas avec la nuit in 2009, and the Prix Jean-Carrière for La Fiancée des corbeaux in 2011. Moreover, he won the Targa Jean Giono in 2012.

Personal life
Frégni resides in Manosque. His daughter lives in Montpellier.

Works

References

Living people
1947 births
Writers from Marseille
People from Manosque
French male novelists
20th-century French novelists
21st-century French novelists
20th-century French male writers
21st-century French male writers